Longport is a borough in Atlantic County, in the U.S. state of New Jersey on the Atlantic Ocean shore of Absecon Island. As of the 2020 United States census, the borough's population was 893, a decrease of two people (−0.2%) from the 2010 census count of 895, which in turn reflected a decline of 159 (−15.1%) from the 1,054 counted in the 2000 census.

History
James Long, an absentee owner, purchased a parcel in 1857 that grew over the years as sand accumulated and as additional property was purchased. Acquired by M. Simpson McCullough in 1882, the community was named Longport in honor of Long.

Longport was incorporated as a borough by an act of the New Jersey Legislature on March 7, 1898, from portions of Egg Harbor Township.

In 2014, residents of Seaview Harbor, located across Beach Thorofare, submitted a petition to join neighboring Longport, citing lack of access to the rest of Egg Harbor Township and high taxes. In November 2016, the Township Committee voted to deny the secession plan. The plan has been brought before an appeals judge and the outcome is pending.

Geography

According to the United States Census Bureau, the borough had a total area of 1.56 square miles (4.03 km2), including 0.40 square miles (1.02 km2) of land and 1.16 square miles (3.01 km2) of water (74.49%).

Streets at the southern end of the borough start at 11th Avenue, as the  that made up the ten numbered streets below it were washed out on the barrier island by a series of storms between 1900 and 1916.  The Great Egg Harbor Inlet shifted north, and Ocean City island was extended by what is now the Gardens neighborhood of that city.

Demographics

2010 census

The Census Bureau's 2006–2010 American Community Survey showed that (in 2010 inflation-adjusted dollars) median household income was $70,625 (with a margin of error of +/− $13,665) and the median family income was $107,188 (+/− $48,480). Males had a median income of $72,143 (+/− $53,388) versus $65,357 (+/− $24,760) for females. The per capita income for the borough was $78,988 (+/− $16,924). About 1.0% of families and 5.1% of the population were below the poverty line, including none of those under age 18 and 5.8% of those age 65 or over.

2000 census
As of the 2000 United States census there were 1,054 people, 544 households, and 317 families residing in the borough. The racial makeup of the borough was 98.58% White, 0.09% African American, 1.14% Asian, and 0.19% from two or more races. Hispanic or Latino of any race were 0.47% of the population.

There were 544 households, out of which 10.8% had children under the age of 18 living with them, 51.3% were married couples living together, 5.1% had a female householder with no husband present, and 41.7% were non-families. 37.5% of all households were made up of individuals, and 19.3% had someone living alone who was 65 years of age or older. The average household size was 1.94 and the average family size was 2.53.

In the borough the population was spread out, with 11.4% under the age of 18, 2.6% from 18 to 24, 18.9% from 25 to 44, 32.6% from 45 to 64, and 34.5% who were 65 years of age or older. The median age was 57 years. For every 100 females, there were 86.5 males. For every 100 females age 18 and over, there were 85.0 males.

The median income for a household in the borough was $51,324, and the median income for a family was $68,194. Males had a median income of $53,250 versus $36,146 for females. The per capita income for the borough was $50,884. About 2.9% of families and 3.7% of the population were below the poverty line, including 2.5% of those under age 18 and 5.5% of those age 65 or over.

Parks and recreation
Longport offers surfing and other water sports recreation on the beaches.

Government

Local government
Longport operates under the Walsh Act commission form of New Jersey municipal government. The city is one of 30 municipalities (of the 564) statewide that use the commission form of government. The governing body is comprised of three commissioners, who are elected at-large to four-year concurrent terms of office on a non-partisan basis as part of the May municipal election. Each commissioner is assigned a department to oversee and administer. The Mayor is then selected from among the three elected Commissioners by a vote between them and assigned to the office by resolution.

, members of the Longport Borough Commission are 
Mayor Nicholas Russo (Commissioner of Public Works, Parks and Public Property), 
Daniel Lawler (Commissioner of Public Affairs and Public Safety) and 
James P. Leeds Sr. (Commissioner of Revenue and Finance), all of whom are serving terms that end December 31, 2024.

In July 2016, the Board of Commissioners voted to shift municipal elections from May to November, which also had the effect of extending the four-year terms of the three commissioners by another six months. The change allows the borough to save the costs associated with conducting the May municipal election.

In 2018, the borough had an average property tax bill of $10,872, the highest in the county, compared to an average bill of $8,767 statewide.

Federal, state and county representation
Longport is located in the 2nd Congressional District and is part of New Jersey's 2nd state legislative district.

 

Atlantic County is governed by a directly elected county executive and a nine-member Board of County Commissioners, responsible for legislation. The executive serves a four-year term and the commissioners are elected to staggered three-year terms, of which four are elected from the county on an at-large basis and five of the commissioners represent equally populated districts. , Atlantic County's Executive is Republican Dennis Levinson, whose term of office ends December 31, 2023. Members of the Board of County Commissioners are:

Ernest D. Coursey, District 1, including Atlantic City (part), Egg Harbor Township (part), and Pleasantville (D, 2022, Atlantic City), Chair Maureen Kern, District 2, including Atlantic City (part), Egg Harbor Township (part), Linwood, Longport, Margate City, Northfield, Somers Point and Ventnor City (R, 2024, Somers Point), Andrew Parker III, District 3, including Egg Harbor Township (part) and Hamilton Township (part) (R, Egg Harbor Township, 2023), Richard R. Dase, District 4, including Absecon, Brigantine, Galloway Township and Port Republic (R, 2022, Galloway Township), James A. Bertino, District 5, including Buena, Buena Vista Township, Corbin City, Egg Harbor City, Estell Manor, Folsom, Hamilton Township (part), Hammonton, Mullica Township and Weymouth Township (R, 2018, Hammonton), Caren L. Fitzpatrick, At-Large (D, 2023, Linwood), Frank X. Balles, At-Large (R, Pleasantville, 2024) Amy L. Gatto, Freeholder (R, 2022, Hamilton Township) and Vice Chair John W. Risley, At-Large (R, 2023, Egg Harbor Township)

Atlantic County's constitutional officers are: 
County Clerk Joesph J. Giralo (R, 2026, Hammonton), 
Sheriff Eric Scheffler (D, 2024, Northfield) and 
Surrogate James Curcio (R, 2025, Hammonton).

Politics
As of March 2011, there were a total of 774 registered voters in Longport, of which 146 (18.9% vs. 30.5% countywide) were registered as Democrats, 366 (47.3% vs. 25.2%) were registered as Republicans and 262 (33.9% vs. 44.3%) were registered as Unaffiliated. There were no voters registered to other parties. Among the borough's 2010 Census population, 86.5% (vs. 58.8% in Atlantic County) were registered to vote, including 97.9% of those ages 18 and over (vs. 76.6% countywide).

In the 2012 presidential election, Republican Mitt Romney received 337 votes (66.5% vs. 41.1% countywide), ahead of Democrat Barack Obama with 160 votes (31.6% vs. 57.9%) and other candidates with 4 votes (0.8% vs. 0.9%), among the 507 ballots cast by the borough's 791 registered voters, for a turnout of 64.1% (vs. 65.8% in Atlantic County). In the 2008 presidential election, Republican John McCain received 372 votes (64.4% vs. 41.6% countywide), ahead of Democrat Barack Obama with 195 votes (33.7% vs. 56.5%) and other candidates with 10 votes (1.7% vs. 1.1%), among the 578 ballots cast by the borough's 903 registered voters, for a turnout of 64.0% (vs. 68.1% in Atlantic County). In the 2004 presidential election, Republican George W. Bush received 412 votes (62.0% vs. 46.2% countywide), ahead of Democrat John Kerry with 242 votes (36.4% vs. 52.0%) and other candidates with 2 votes (0.3% vs. 0.8%), among the 664 ballots cast by the borough's 946 registered voters, for a turnout of 70.2% (vs. 69.8% in the whole county).

In the 2013 gubernatorial election, Republican Chris Christie received 306 votes (76.1% vs. 60.3% countywide), ahead of Democrat Barbara Buono with 81 votes (20.1% vs. 34.9%) and other candidates with  votes (0.0% vs. 1.3%), among the 402 ballots cast by the borough's 803 registered voters, yielding a 50.1% turnout (vs. 41.5% in the county). In the 2009 gubernatorial election, Republican Chris Christie received 280 votes (63.9% vs. 47.7% countywide), ahead of Democrat Jon Corzine with 135 votes (30.8% vs. 44.5%), Independent Chris Daggett with 14 votes (3.2% vs. 4.8%) and other candidates with 4 votes (0.9% vs. 1.2%), among the 438 ballots cast by the borough's 817 registered voters, yielding a 53.6% turnout (vs. 44.9% in the county).

Education
For kindergarten through eighth grade, public school students from Longport attend the Margate City Schools in Margate City as part of a sending/receiving relationship. Longport is a non-operating school district that had 49 students in the Margate district and 8 in Atlantic City for high school as of 2010, operating with a three-member board of education that oversaw its relationships with its sending districts. As of the 2018–19 school year, the district, comprised of two schools, had an enrollment of 351 students and 48.8 classroom teachers (on an FTE basis), for a student–teacher ratio of 7.2:1. Schools in the district (with 2018–19 enrollment data from the National Center for Education Statistics) are 
William H. Ross III Elementary School 169 students in grades K–4 and 
Eugene A. Tighe Middle School with 181 students in grades 5–8.

Starting in the 2014–15 school year, public school students from Longport in grades 9–12 attend Ocean City High School as part of a sending/receiving relationship with the Ocean City School District; the Longport district, which is closer to Ocean City and would save significantly on tuition costs per student, received permission from the New Jersey Department of Education to end the relationship with Atlantic City. As of the 2018–19 school year, Ocean City High School had an enrollment of 1,245 students and 98.5 classroom teachers (on an FTE basis), for a student–teacher ratio of 12.6:1.

Through the 2013–14 school year, Longport's students had attended Atlantic City High School, along with those from Brigantine, Margate City and Ventnor City, as part of a sending/receiving relationship with the Atlantic City School District. The Longport Board of Education had investigated the possibility of offering city students the option of attending either Atlantic City High School or Ocean City High School, as part of an effort to control the costs for the average of ten Longport students sent to attend public high school annually. With the Atlantic City district charging tuition estimated at nearly $24,000 per student as of 2013–2014 and the Ocean City School District charging 25% less per student, district officials estimated prospective savings of $128,000 in the first five years, though those savings could disappear if more of the nearly two-thirds of students attending private high schools were to shift to choose the new Ocean City option. In June 2014, the Acting State Commissioner of Education approved the end of the relationship with the Atlantic City district under which Longport's students could start attending Ocean City High School starting with the 2014–2015 school year.

Borough public school students are also eligible to attend the Atlantic County Institute of Technology in the Mays Landing section of Hamilton Township or the Charter-Tech High School for the Performing Arts, located in Somers Point.

Private school options in the area include Holy Spirit High School in Absecon, under the Roman Catholic Diocese of Camden and St. Augustine Preparatory School, which is an all-boys Augustinian, Catholic college preparatory institution.

Transportation

Roads and highways

No Interstate, U.S., state or major county highways directly serve Longport. The only numbered roads in Longport are minor county routes, such as County Route 629.

The Longport Bridge
There is access to and from the mainland and Ocean City by way of a series of bridges and causeways including the JFK Memorial Bridge, The Ocean City Bridge, and the Dolores G. Cooper Bridge, also known as Longport-Somers Point Boulevard.

Public transportation
NJ Transit provides bus service on the 505 route between the borough and Atlantic City.

Climate

According to the Köppen climate classification system, Longport, New Jersey has a humid subtropical climate (Cfa) with hot, moderately humid summers, cool winters and year-around precipitation. Cfa climates are characterized by all months having an average mean temperature > 32.0 °F (> 0.0 °C), at least four months with an average mean temperature ≥ 50.0 °F (≥ 10.0 °C), at least one month with an average mean temperature ≥ 71.6 °F (≥ 22.0 °C) and no significant precipitation difference between seasons. During the summer months in Longport, a cooling afternoon sea breeze is present on most days, but episodes of extreme heat and humidity can occur with heat index values ≥ 95 °F (≥ 35 °C). During the winter months, episodes of extreme cold and wind can occur with wind chill values < 0 °F (< −18 °C). The plant hardiness zone at Longport Beach is 7b with an average annual extreme minimum air temperature of 7.0 °F (−13.9 °C). The average seasonal (November–April) snowfall total is between 12 and 18 inches (31 and 46 cm), and the average snowiest month is February which corresponds with the annual peak in nor'easter activity.

Ecology

According to the A. W. Kuchler U.S. potential natural vegetation types, Longport, New Jersey would have a dominant vegetation type of Northern Cordgrass (73) with a dominant vegetation form of Coastal Prairie (20).

Notable people

People who were born in, residents of, or otherwise closely associated with Longport include:

 Leland Beloff (born 1942),  member of the Pennsylvania House of Representatives and the Philadelphia City Council who resigned from office after being convicted in Federal court on extortion charges
 Jack Crawford (born 1988), professional American football player for the Oakland Raiders
 Thomas Cruse (1857–1943), United States Army brigadier general who was a recipient of the Medal of Honor for valor in action in 1882 at the Battle of Big Dry Wash
 Louis Johanson (1929–2004), member of the Pennsylvania State Senate and the Philadelphia City Council who was convicted for accepting a bribe in the Abscam sting operation
 Howard Kupperman (1931–2014), politician who represented the 2nd Legislative District in the New Jersey General Assembly from 1976 to 1978 and served as the mayor of Longport from 1983 to 1992
 Heinie Miller (1893–1964), football player who played in the early years of the National Football League for the Buffalo All-Americans and the Milwaukee Badgers
 Paul Steelman (born 1955), architect
 James Hugh Joseph Tate (1910–1983), mayor of Philadelphia from 1962 to 1972

References

External links

 Longport Borough website
 Margate City Schools
 
 School Data for the Margate City Schools, National Center for Education Statistics
 Atlantic City High School
 The Current of Longport
Longport, South of Atlantic City, New Jersey, September 5, 1889 by D.J. Kennedy, Historical Society of Pennsylvania

 
1898 establishments in New Jersey
Boroughs in Atlantic County, New Jersey
Jersey Shore communities in Atlantic County
New Jersey District Factor Group none
Populated places established in 1898
Walsh Act